Winsted, also known as the Todd House and the Old Brick House, is a historic home located at Aberdeen, Harford County, Maryland, United States. It is a two-story, five-bay brick federal style dwelling on a low stone foundation. Also on the property is a small one-story rubble stone smokehouse.

Winsted was listed on the National Register of Historic Places in 1979.

References

External links
, including photo from 1977, Maryland Historical Trust

Houses in Harford County, Maryland
Houses on the National Register of Historic Places in Maryland
Federal architecture in Maryland
Aberdeen, Maryland
National Register of Historic Places in Harford County, Maryland